Mālupe Parish is an administrative unit of Alūksne Municipality, Latvia.

Towns, villages and settlements of Mālupe Parish 

Parishes of Latvia
Alūksne Municipality